Cymo is a genus of crabs in the family Xanthidae, containing the following species:

Cymo andreossyi (Audouin, 1826)
Cymo barunae Ho & Ng, 2005
Cymo cerasma Morgan, 1990
Cymo deplanatus A. Milne-Edwards, 1873
Cymo lanatopodus Galil & Vannini, 1990
Cymo melanodactylus Dana, 1852
Cymo quadrilobatus Miers, 1884
Cymo tuberculatus Ortmann, 1893

References

Xanthoidea
Decapod genera